Daniel Zomparelli is a Canadian writer from Vancouver, British Columbia. He is married to American screenwriter Gabe Liedman.

A 2006 graduate of Simon Fraser University, he worked for the magazine Adbusters before becoming founding editor of the poetry magazine Poetry Is Dead. He has since published the poetry collections Davie Street Translations and Rom Com, and the short fiction collection Everything Is Awful and You're a Terrible Person. Everything Is Awful was a shortlisted finalist for the 2018 Ethel Wilson Fiction Prize, and won the 2018 ReLit Award for short fiction.

Works
Davie Street Translations (2012)
Rom Com (2015, with Dina Del Bucchia)
Everything Is Awful and You're a Terrible Person (2017)

References

External links

21st-century Canadian poets
21st-century Canadian short story writers
21st-century Canadian male writers
Canadian male poets
Canadian male short story writers
Canadian people of Italian descent
Canadian gay writers
Canadian LGBT poets
Simon Fraser University alumni
Writers from Vancouver
Living people
Year of birth missing (living people)
21st-century Canadian LGBT people
Gay poets